

as
Asacol
Asaphen
Asbron
ascorbic acid (INN)
Ascorbicap
Ascriptin
Asellacrin 10
aselizumab (INN)
asenapine (INN)
Asendin
aseripide (INN)
asfotase alfa (INN)
asimadoline (INN)
Asmalix, also known as theophylline.
asobamast (INN)
asocainol (INN)
asoprisnil (USAN)
asparaginase (INN)
aspartame (INN)
aspartic acid (INN)
aspartocin (INN)
Aspercin
Aspergum
aspirin
aspoxicillin (INN)
Astelin
astemizole (INN)
Astramorph PF
astromicin (INN)
astuprotimut-R (USAN)
asunaprevir (USAN, INN)

at

ata-atn
Atabrine (Abbott) 
Atacand
atacicept (USAN, INN)
ataciguat (INN)
atagabalin (USAN, INN)
ataluren (USAN, INN)
atamestane (INN)
ataprost (INN)
Atapryl
Atarax
Atasol
atazanavir (USAN)
atecegatran fexenetil (INN)
atecegatran (INN)
Atehexal (Hexal Australia) [Au], also known as atenolol.
atenolol (INN)
atevirdine (INN)
atexakin alfa (INN)
ATG
Atgam
Athrombin-K
Athrombin
atibeprone (INN)
atiglifozin (INN)
atilmotin (USAN)
atinumab (INN)
atiratecan (INN)
atipamezole (INN)
atiprimod (INN)
atiprosin (INN)
Ativan
atizoram (INN)
atliprofen (INN)
Atnaa

ato-atr
atolide (INN)
Atolone Oral
atomoxetine (USAN)
atopaxar (USAN, INN)
atorolimumab (INN)
atorvastatin (INN)
atosiban (INN)
atovaquone (INN)
Atozine Oral
atracurium besilate (INN)
atreleuton (INN)
atriciguat (INN)
Atridox
atrimustine (INN)
atrinositol (INN)
Atrohist Plus
atromepine (INN)
Atromid-S
Atropair
Atropen
atropine
atropine methonitrate (INN)
atropine oxide (INN)
Atrosept
Atrovent
Attenuvax

au
Augmentin
Auralgan
auranofin (INN)
Aureomycin
Aurexis (Inhibitex)
Aurodex
Aurolate
aurothioglycanide (INN)
Auroto
Autoplex T

av
avagacestat (USAN, INN)
Avagard
Avage
Avalide
avanafil (USAN)
Avandamet
Avandia
Avapro
AVAR
avasimibe (INN)
Avaxim
AVC
Aveeno Cleansing Bar
Avelox
Aventyl
Aviane
avibactam (INN)
avicatonin (INN)
avilamycin (INN)
Avinza
aviptadil (INN)
aviscumine (INN)
Avita. Redirects to Tretinoin.
Avitene
avitriptan (INN)
avizafone (INN)
Avlosulfon
avobenzone (INN)
Avodart
Avonex
avoparcin (INN)
avorelin (INN)
avosentan (INN)
avotermin (INN)
avridine (INN)

ax-ay
axamozide (INN)
Axert
Axid
axitinib (USAN)
Axocet
axomadol (USAN)
Axotal
Aygestin

az

aza

azab-azaq
azabon (INN)
azabuperone (INN)
azacitidine (INN)
azaclorzine (INN)
azaconazole (INN)
azacosterol (INN)
Azactam
azacyclonol (INN)
azaftozine (INN)
Azahexal (Hexal Australia) [Au], also known as azathioprine.
azalanstat (INN)
azalomycin (INN)
azaloxan (INN)
azamethonium bromide (INN)
azamulin (INN)
azanator (INN)
azanidazole (INN)
azaperone (INN)
azaprocin (INN)
azapropazone (INN)
azaquinzole (INN)

azar-azat
azaribine (INN)
Azasan
azaserine (INN)
azasetron (INN)
azaspirium chloride (INN)
azastene (INN)
azatadine (INN)
azatepa (INN)
azathioprine (INN)

azd-azm
Azdone
azelaic acid (INN)
azelastine (INN)
Azelex
azelnidipine (INN)
azepexole (INN)
azepindole (INN)
azetirelin (INN)
azficel-T (USAN)
azidamfenicol (INN)
azidocillin (INN)
azilsartan (INN)
azilsartan kamedoxomil (USAN)
azilsartan medoxomil (USAN)
azimexon (INN)
azimilide (INN)
azintamide (INN)
azipramine (INN)
azithromycin (INN)
Azlin
azlocillin (INN)
Azmacort

azo-azu
Azo Gantanol
Azo Gantrisin
Azolid
azolimine (INN)
Azopt
azosemide (INN)
azotomycin (INN)
azoximer bromide (INN)
aztreonam (INN)
Azulfidine
azumolene (INN)